These hits topped the Dutch Top 40 in 1974.

See also
1974 in music

References

1974 in the Netherlands
1974 record charts
1974